Riverside is an unincorporated community in Eddy County, New Mexico, in the southwestern United States. It is located on the left bank (east side) of the Pecos River about five miles east of Artesia, New Mexico on U.S. Route 82 (Lovington Highway). Riverside is in the Loco Hills Division of Eddy County.

The community of Riverside grew up in the 1970s as a place for oil workers' mobile homes and oil field support. It was almost abandoned in the early 1980s, but came back in the 1990s as oil prices rose. Mack Energy Corporation has its corporate offices in Riverside.

References

Unincorporated communities in Eddy County, New Mexico
Unincorporated communities in New Mexico